The 2007 NCAA Division I Cross Country Championships were the 69th annual NCAA Men's Division I Cross Country Championship and the 27th annual NCAA Women's Division I Cross Country Championship to determine the team and individual national champions of NCAA Division I men's and women's collegiate cross country running in the United States. In all, four different titles were contested: men's and women's individual and team championships.

Held on November 19, 2007, the combined meet was the fourth of eight consecutive meets hosted by Indiana State University at the LaVern Gibson Championship Cross Country Course in Terre Haute, Indiana.  The distance for the men's race was 10 kilometers (6.21 miles) while the distance for the women's race was 6 kilometers (3.73 miles). 

The men's team championship was won by Oregon (85 points), the Ducks' fifth (and first since 1977). The women's team championship was again won by Stanford (195 points), the Cardinal's fourth overall, second consecutive, and third in four years.

The two individual champions were, for the men, Josh McDougal (Liberty, 29:22.4) and, for the women, Sally Kipyego (Texas Tech, 19:30.9).

Men's title
Distance: 10,000 meters

Men's Team Result (Top 10)

Men's Individual Result (Top 10)

Women's title
Distance: 6,000 meters

Women's Team Result (Top 10)

Women's Individual Result (Top 10)

References
 

NCAA Cross Country Championships
NCAA Division I Cross Country Championships
NCAA Division I Cross Country Championships
NCAA Division I Cross Country Championships
Track and field in Indiana
Terre Haute, Indiana
Indiana State University